The Geological Survey of Belgium (GSB, French: Service géologique de Belgique) is a Belgian federal research institute for Belgian geology. It is a department of the Royal Belgian Institute of Natural Sciences. The institute is as a resource centre and project partner which produces maps, books and databases of Belgian geology. The GSB is a member of the European Geological Surveys network.

History
The institute was founded in 1896 and includes a Documentation Center for Earth Sciences on geological and hydrogeological data and a Research and Development department.

See also
 BELSPO
 Geographical Information System (GIS)
 International Union of Geological Sciences

References
 Memoirs of the Geological Survey of Belgium
 Geological Survey of Belgium - Marine Geology Group
 Museum of the Geological Survey of Belgium (GSB)

External links
 Geological Survey of Belgium

Research institutes in Belgium
Science and technology in Belgium
National geological agencies
Belgium